The Olympic Champ is a 1942 Goofy cartoon made by Walt Disney Animation Studios which explains the events in track and field at the Olympic Games.

Summary
It starts off with Goofy doing the Olympic torch relay to the cauldron and then explains the events in track and field such as pole vault, relay race, shot put, and other events which end Goofy in the trophy area.

Voice cast
 Goofy: Pinto Colvig
 Narrator: John McLeish

Home media
The short was released on December 2, 2002, on Walt Disney Treasures: The Complete Goofy.

Additional releases include:
 The Goofy World of Sports – VHS (1992)
It's a Small World of Fun! Volume 2 – DVD (2006)

References

1942 films
1942 animated films
1940s sports films
Goofy (Disney) short films
Films about the Summer Olympics
Films about Olympic track and field
1940s Disney animated short films
Films directed by Jack Kinney
Films produced by Walt Disney